The Sol Plaatje Museum and Library is in Kimberley, Northern Cape, South Africa, in a house where Solomon T. Plaatje lived during his last years at 32 Angel Street, Malay Camp. It was here that Plaatje wrote Mhudi.

The Sol Plaatje Educational Trust was set up in 1991 to serve as a custodian for this and other legacy projects. In 1992, 32 Angel Street was declared a National Monument (Provincial Heritage Site under 1999 legislation. Plaatje's grave in West End Cemetery, Kimberley, is also a declared provincial heritage site.

References

External links
 Sol Plaatje Museum

History museums in South Africa
Apartheid museums
Museums in the Northern Cape
Buildings and structures in Kimberley, Northern Cape
Biographical museums in South Africa